Route 211 is a regional arterial road in the southern Israel, leading from the Nitzana Border Crossing in the west, through the shoulder of Nitsana, Shadmat Sheizaf, Shunra sands and the Kora Valley to Ramat Boker.

History
Route 211 was paved by the British Mandate authorities during World War II as part of the preparations for a possible German invasion. The participation of Shmuel Mikunis in the construction of the road led to the name of the road: "Mykonis Road". In 1977, at the initiative of Yekutiel Adam, then the Deputy Chief of Staff, the re-paving of the previously very winding road was started.

On 18 January 2010, during floods that occurred in Nahal Nitsana, the bridge carrying the road over it collapsed, and the settlements of Pethat Nitsana were cut off.

See also
List of highways in Israel

References

211